Someshvara IV or  was the last king of the Western Chalukya empire. He made a brief attempt after 1189 to revive the Chalukya kingdom by defeating the waning Kalachuri kingdom. He managed to capture Basavakalyana briefly but failed to prevent the other feudatories, the Seuna, Hoysala and the Kakatiya dynasty from completely overwhelming the Chalukya empire by 1200. In the end, the three feudatories divided the vast area between the Kaveri River and Narmada River amongst themselves.

He was overthrown by a Seuna Yadava feudatory.

References

Book
 
 

1200 deaths
Western Chalukya Empire